Frans Stefanus Erasmus  (19 June 1959 – 7 March 1998) was a South African rugby union player who played three test matches for the South Africa national rugby union team.

Playing career
Erasmus started his provincial career with Northern Free State in 1980.  He also played for South Western Districts, Northern Transvaal for one season and Eastern Province where he become a stalwart, playing 119 matches.

Erasmus made his debut for the Springboks in the third test against the New Zealand Cavaliers on 24 May 1986 at Loftus Versfeld in Pretoria.

Test history

See also
List of South Africa national rugby union players – Springbok no. 549

References

1959 births
1998 deaths
South African rugby union players
South Africa international rugby union players
People from Ceres, Western Cape
Rugby union players from the Western Cape
Rugby union props
SWD Eagles players
Blue Bulls players
Eastern Province Elephants players